Slatino is a village in the municipality of Tearce, North Macedonia.

Demographics
As of the 2021 census, Slatino had 3,198 residents with the following ethnic composition:
Albanians 3,125
Persons for whom data are taken from administrative sources 65
Others 8

According to the 2002 census, the village had a total of 4,112 inhabitants. Ethnic groups in the village include:
Albanians 4,018
Macedonians 11
Romani 7
Serbs 1 
Bosniaks 1
Others 75

References

Villages in Tearce Municipality
Albanian communities in North Macedonia